Maryboy is a surname. Notable people with the surname include:

Kenneth Maryboy (born 1961), American politician
Mark Maryboy (born 1955), American politician
Nancy C. Maryboy, Cherokee and Navajo Indigenous science expert